The 1989 Miami riot was sparked after Miami Police Department (MPD) officer William Lozano shot Black motorcyclist Clement Lloyd on January 16, 1989. Lloyd, 23, was fleeing from another MPD officer who was chasing him for an alleged traffic violation. Lozano was on foot investigating an unrelated incident, heard about the situation on his police radio and later stated the motorcycle "veered toward him". Lozano fired a shot at the motorcycle, striking Lloyd in the head and killing him instantly. The motorcycle crashed into an oncoming car, injuring two occupants. Lloyd's passenger, Allan Blanchard, 24, died the following day from his injuries. Several Black witnesses stated that Lozano walked almost to the center of the street with his handgun and poised ready to shoot for several seconds as the motorcyle approached. Rioting began almost immediately after the shooting in Overtown, and on the following day in Liberty City, both predominantly Black neighborhoods of Miami, and continued until January 19 when the Chicago Bulls including star player Michael Jordan played a scheduled game in Overtown against the Miami Heat, who were in their inaugural season. Schools were closed and police cordoned off a 130-block area and teargassed rioting crowds.

Lozano was convicted of manslaughter; it was not until 2015, when Nouman Raja was charged in the shooting of Corey Jones, that another Florida law enforcement officer was sentenced for an on-duty shooting. However, Lozano was granted a new trial, on the basis that the trial should not have been held in Miami, because of racial tensions, and that the prosecution should not have been allowed to introduce evidence about police procedures and Lozano's training. In overturning Lozano's conviction, the appeals court argued that the jury in his trial had been influenced by fears that failing to convict would lead to further unrest. A new trial was held in Orlando, Florida, and Lozano was acquitted.

See also
 1968 Miami riot
 1980 Miami riots
 List of incidents of civil unrest in the United States

References

External links
 "Miami riots 1989" on YouTube, NBC News coverage of the 1989 riots.
 "1989 Miami Riot Live Shot on YouTube, Channel 4 coverage of the 1989 riot.

1989 riots
1980s in Miami
Racially motivated violence against African Americans
African-American riots in the United States
African-American history in Miami
History of racism in Florida
Riots and civil disorder in Miami-Dade County, Florida
1989 in Florida
January 1989 events in the United States
1989 deaths
People shot dead by law enforcement officers in the United States
Police brutality in the United States
Miami-Dade Police Department